Amanda Rachelle Cerny (born June 26, 1991) is an American Internet personality, actress, and model. She is best known for her YouTube channel and formerly her Vine profile on which she had over 4 million followers. She was Playboy magazine's Playmate of the Month for October 2011.

Early life and background
Amanda Cerny was born on June 26, 1991, in Pittsburgh, Pennsylvania.

Career
At the age of 15, Cerny began working as a model at the time, as a hobby. She was featured in Playboy as the Playmate of the Month in the October 2011 edition. Cerny began posting content on Vine, and had over 4.6 million followers. She became a celebrity on YouTube, Instagram, Snapchat, Facebook, and Twitter.

In August 2017, Cerny was named head of music streaming platform LiveXLive's newly formed Digital Talent Division.

In June 2018 she was featured in the official video of Cardi B's "I Like It" alongside J Balvin and Bad Bunny. In January 2020, Cerny did a Punjabi music video "Where Baby Where" with Gippy Grewal.

Filmography
 2016: Maroon 5: "Don't Wanna Know"
 2017: Workaholics
 2018: Ridiculousness
 2019: Airplane Mode as herself
 2020: The Babysitter: Killer Queen as Violet
 2020: The Gentleman
 2021: iCarly as Harmony in "iNeed Space"

References

External links 
 
 

1991 births
Living people
American YouTubers
American Internet celebrities
American people of Czech descent
2010s Playboy Playmates
American women comedians
Video bloggers
American television actresses
American film actresses
21st-century American actresses
Florida State University alumni
American comedians
Vine (service) celebrities
OnlyFans creators